The 2008 International GT Open season was the third season of the International GT Open, the grand tourer-style sports car racing founded in 2006 by the Spanish GT Sport Organización. It began on 19 April at ACI Vallelunga Circuit and finished on 2 November, at Barcelona after eight double-header meetings.

Overall championship and GTA class was won by Scuderia Playteam SaraFree drivers Michele Maceratesi and Andrea Montermini, while GTS class title was clinched by Marco Cioci and Andrea Pellizzato.

Race calendar and results

References

External links
 

International GT Open
International GT Open seasons